Alveley Halt was a halt on the original Severn Valley Line, situated between the villages of Highley and Alveley, in the English county of Shropshire. The station, which was not re-opened by the heritage Severn Valley Railway, has been replaced by the adjacent Country Park Halt around  up the line.

History
Mining at the Alveley Colliery began in 1938, and the halt opened around 1944 for the workers at the Colliery.

Ownership of the halt passed from the Great Western Railway to the Western Region of British Railways during the nationalisation of 1948.  The Severn Valley Railway between Shrewsbury and Bewdley was closed to passenger and through goods traffic by the British Transport Commission in 1963.  However, the southern section of track from the Colliery, which included the halt, remained open for coal traffic until the Colliery closed in January 1969.

The site today

In summer 1973, the halt was demolished as the platform-face was collapsing towards the track. At the time, preparations were underway for the 1974 re-opening of the line by the Severn Valley Railway between Hampton Loade and Bewdley. Today, the former halt is a grass-covered piece of raised rough-ground, situated on the western side of the line adjacent to a level crossing. A section of GWR bridge rail, presumably a former signpost, still stands upright on the site.

The line passing through the halt is still active, and heritage trains from the Severn Valley Railway travel up it between Hampton Loade and Highley stations.

References

 Station on navigable O.S. map North of Highley near Alveley Village
 
 

Disused railway stations in Shropshire
Former Great Western Railway stations
Railway stations in Great Britain opened in 1944
Railway stations in Great Britain closed in 1963